Hopea hainanensis is a species of tree in the family Dipterocarpaceae. It is found in Hainan Island of China and northern Vietnam. Hopea hainanensis produces the acetylcholinesterase inhibitor Hopeahainol A.

References

hainanensis
Trees of China
Trees of Vietnam
Flora of Hainan
Critically endangered flora of Asia
Taxonomy articles created by Polbot
Taxa named by Elmer Drew Merrill